Cidramus or Kidramos, also known as Kidrama, was a town of ancient Phrygia and later of Caria, inhabited in Roman and Byzantine times. It became a bishopric; no longer the seat of a residential bishop, it remains a titular see of the Roman Catholic Church. The town issued coins with the legend ΚΙΔΡΑΜΗΝΩΝ. 

Its site is located near Yorga in Asiatic Turkey.

References

Populated places in ancient Caria
Populated places in Phrygia
Catholic titular sees in Asia
Former populated places in Turkey
Roman towns and cities in Turkey
History of Denizli Province